Veronica calycina, commonly known as hairy speedwell or cup speedwell, is a flowering plant in the family Plantaginaceae. It is a trailing perennial with dark green leaves, purple-blue flowers and is endemic to Australia.

Description
Flowering occurs in spring and summer.

Taxonomy
Veronica calycina was first formally described in 1810 by Robert Brown and the description was published in  Prodromus Florae Novae Hollandiae et Insulae Van Diemen. The specific epithet (calycina) means "belonging to the calyx".

Distribution
Hairy speedwell is a widespread species, found in all states and territories apart from the Northern Territory. It grows in sheltered forest and shrubland on the coast, ranges and at higher altitudes in shady, moist locations.

References

Flora of New South Wales
calycina
Plants described in 1810